Cydia ingens, the longleaf pine seedworm moth, is a moth of the family Tortricidae. It is found in southeastern North America.

The caterpillars (longleaf pine seedworms) feed on the seeds of Pinus palustris.

Grapholitini